Sian Kaʼan Biosphere Reserve is a biosphere reserve in the municipality of Tulum in the Mexican state of Quintana Roo.  It was established in 1986 and became a UNESCO World Heritage Site in 1987.

“Sian Ka’an” means “gate of heaven” or “a place where heaven begins”.

With the participation of scientists, technicians, students, fishermen, farmers, rural promoters and administrators, together with regional and international partners, have successfully carried out more than 200 conservation projects basing all conservation actions on scientific and technical information for planning and implementing environmental policies and the proposal of viable solutions for sustainable use of natural resources and focusing their efforts established within eight protected natural areas that include the reefs of Banco Chinchorro, and Xcalak at South of Quintana Roo, Sian Kaʼan Biosphere Reserve, Cancun, the island of Cozumel that is located in front of Xcaret and Contoy Island up North, covering . These areas lie in parts of all seven Caribbean Sea coastal municipalities of the state, with the largest part being in eastern Felipe Carrillo Puerto Municipality, where the vast majority of Sian Kaʼan Biosphere Reserve lies.

Part of the reserve is on land and part is in the Caribbean Sea, including a section of coral reef. The reserve has an area of 5,280 km2.

The reserve also includes some 23 known archaeological sites of the Maya civilization including Muyil. Remains of the Decauville railway Vigía Chico-Santa Cruz, which was operated from 1905 to 1932, can be found at several places.

Within the Amigos de Sian Kaʼan project objectives are the identification, protection and management of additional areas with high biodiversity value as well as those critical for maintenance of the life cycles of endangered, threatened and migratory species in the Riviera Maya and providing environmental education through books, journals and pamphlets and giving technical assistance and training to Mayan communities working with ecotourism.

Biological species
A list of some of the species recorded in Sian Kaʼan:

 Alouatta pigra (Yucatán black howler monkey)
 Amazona xantholora (yellow-lored amazon)
 Ardea herodias (great blue heron)
 Ateles geoffroyi (Geoffroy's spider monkey)
 Caracara plancus (crested caracara)
 Crax rubra (great curassow)
 Crocodylus acutus (American crocodile)
 Crocodylus moreletii (Morelet's crocodile)
 Ctenosaura similis (black iguana)
 Cuniculus paca (spotted paca)
 Dasyprocta punctata (Central American agouti)
 Dicotyles tajacu (collared peccary)
 Eira barbara (tayra)
 Fregata magnificens (magnificent frigatebird)
 Galictis vittata (greater grison)
 Jabiru mycteria (jabiru)
 Leopardus pardalis (ocelot)
 Leopardus wiedii (margay)
 Meleagris ocellata (ocellated turkey)
 Mycteria americana (wood stork)
 Nasua narica (white-nosed coati)
 Odocoileus virginianus (white-tailed deer)
 Panthera onca (jaguar)
 Pelecanus occidentalis (brown pelican)
 Nannopterum brasilianum (neotropic cormorant)
 Phoenicopterus ruber (American flamingo)
 Platalea ajaja (roseate spoonbill)
 Potos flavus (kinkajou)
 Puma concolor (puma)
 Puma yagouaroundi (jaguarundi)
 Ramphastos sulfuratus (keel-billed toucan)
 Sarcoramphus papa (king vulture)
 Tamandua mexicana (tamandua)
 Tapirus bairdii (Baird's tapir)
 Tayassu pecari (white-lipped peccary)

References

External links 

 Amigos de Sian Kaʼan / Friends of Sian Kaʼan (bilingual) conservation group
 Centro Ecologico Sian Kaʼanin English and Spanish 

Biosphere reserves of Mexico
Protected areas of Quintana Roo
Tulum (municipality)
Archaeological sites in Quintana Roo
Natural history of Quintana Roo
Ramsar sites in Mexico
Protected areas established in 1986
1986 establishments in Mexico
World Heritage Sites in Mexico
Important Bird Areas of Mexico